Cataclinusa is a genus of flies in the family Phoridae.

Species
C. bucki Schmitz, 1927
C. pachycondylae (Brues, 1904)

References

Phoridae
Platypezoidea genera